Israir Airlines served the following destinations as of December 2012:

List

References

Lists of airline destinations